Giacomo Orsini (1497–?) was a Roman Catholic prelate who served as Bishop of Bitonto (1517–1530).

Biography
Giacomo Orsini was born in 1497.
On 27 Feb 1517, he was appointed during the papacy of Pope Leo X as Bishop of Bitonto,
He served as Bishop of Bitonto until his resignation on 24 Jan 1530	.

References

External links and additional sources
 (for Chronology of Bishops) 
 (for Chronology of Bishops) 

16th-century Italian Roman Catholic bishops
Bishops appointed by Pope Leo X
1497 births
Bishops of Bitonto